Dimitri Vegas & Like Mike are a Belgian–Greek DJ duo composed of brothers Dimitri Thivaios and Michael Thivaios. They were ranked No. 1 on DJ Mags Top 100 DJs list in 2015 and 2019, and were ranked No. 2 in 2014, 2016, 2017, 2018, and 2020.

They have performed at numerous festivals worldwide such as EXIT festival, Electric Daisy Carnival, Electric Zoo, Parookaville, UNTOLD, Creamfields and Tomorrowland, where they have been the official resident DJs since 2010. They have held summer DJ residencies in Ibiza at Amnesia (2014-2016) and more recently Ushuaïa Ibiza (2017 to present).

They run the record label Smash the House which was founded in 2010, and have collaborated with artists that include Afrojack, Armin van Buuren, Daddy Yankee, David Guetta, Era Istrefi, Fatboy Slim, Gucci Mane, Hardwell, Martin Garrix, Paris Hilton, Steve Angello, Sebastian Yatra and Kid Ink, and have remixed artists such as Lady Gaga, the Chainsmokers and (G)I-dle.

History

Pre–2009: Early life and career
Dimitri and Michael Thivaios are of Greek origin. The brothers grew up in the Flemish town of Willebroek. They began to make their first steps as DJs reportedly at a young age. Very quickly, they made several appearances in small clubs and were resident BeatFM radio DJs. Dimitri then left Flanders in 1999 and began touring Europe. He lived in Mallorca and then in Halkidiki, Greece before moving to Ibiza in 2003, where he was a resident in major clubs such as Privilege and Space.

2009–present: Breakthrough and success

Dimitri Vegas & Like Mike released their first single in 2009, "Liquid Skies" under the alias DNM. In 2010, after founding their own record label Smash the House, they were tasked with writing the official anthem for the 2010 edition of Tomorrowland, "Tomorrow (Give in to the Night)". This song was their first top 20 hit, peaking at number 16 in Belgium. The duo continued to write the Tomorrowland anthems up to the 2014 edition, this included the 2013 anthem "Chattahoochee" which peaked at number two in the Belgian charts. 2014 also saw the release of "Tremor" with Dutch DJ Martin Garrix which, in 2018, Billboard named their best song.

In May 2015, Dimitri Vegas & Like Mike scored their first Belgian number one with "The Hum" with Dutch dj Ummet Ozcan. Charlie Sheen and Jean-Claude Van Damme starred in the song's official music video. "The Hum" was quickly followed by the release of "Higher Place" (featuring Ne-Yo) which also peaked at number one in Belgium, both songs also certified platinum in the duo's home country. At Amsterdam Dance Event 2015, the duo were voted as the world's number one DJ, by DJ Magazine, being the first Belgians to do so. 2016 saw the group's third number one and platinum single with "Hey Baby". and they finished runners-up in DJ Mag's top 100 DJ poll behind Martin Garrix.

2017 saw the release of their platinum selling single "Complicated", certifying in both Belgium and The Netherlands, in addition to their long-awaited festivals gimmick "Crowd Control". They also released a rendition of "He's a Pirate" with Hans Zimmer for the Pirates of the Caribbean: Dead Men Tell No Tales movie that same year. At Tomorrowland, the duo debuted their "Garden of Madness" stage at the festival which has been a part of the event ever since.

On 22 June 2018, Dimitri Vegas & Like Mike released the single "When I Grow Up", with American rapper Wiz Khalifa. The music video for "When I Grow Up" was directed by Belgian directors Adil El Arbi and Bilall Fallah, who had recently cast Dimitri & Mike for an acting role in their Belgian movie Gangsta. On 28 September the duo released the song "Bounce" featuring Bassjackers, Julian Banks and Snoop Dogg.

On 15 February 2019, Dimitri Vegas & Like Mike and Era Istrefi released "Selfish"  which achieved the number one position on the Billboard Dance Chart. On 10 May 2019, Dimitri & Mike released their song "Best Friends Ass" with Paris Hilton. The music video for the single featured a number of known personalities including YouTubers Nikita Dragun, Vitaly Zdorovetskiy and Juanpa Zurita, singer-songwriter Chester Lockhart, former UFC fighter Chuck Liddell and Kim Kardashian. Later in 2019, they achieved their first 2× platinum single with "Instagram", a collaboration with David Guetta, Daddy Yankee, Afro Bros and Natti Natasha. In addition to this, after three years in second place, Dimitri Vegas & Like Mike reclaimed their place as world's No.1 DJs in the DJ Mag Top 100 DJs Poll. The brothers closed the decade with a collaboration with Sebastian Yatra, Afro Bros, Camilo and Emilia on ‘Boomshakalaka’.

On 5 February 2021, Dimitri Vegas & Like Mike released a remixed version of "Hwaa" by (G)I-dle, a South Korean kpop girl group.

On 24 July 2020, Dimitri Vegas & Like Mike along with DJ Regard released a dance cover of Destiny's Child "Say My Name". The following day the duo played the closing set for the first virtual festival held by Tomorrowland. The event named "Tomorrowland Around the World" took place on 25 July and 26 July as a replacement for the usual festival which was cancelled due to the COVID-19 pandemic.

In August 2021, the duo collabed with mobile battle royale game "Garena Free Fire", under the collab game will release playable characters based on the duo in-game, official announcement was made by Garena Free Fire's official social media handles on 4 August 2021.

Dimitri Vegas & Like Mike had also previously released track for in-game event "Rampage" of Garena Free Fire in July 2021. On 20 August 2021, Dimitri Vegas & Like Mike along with Alok and KSHMR released collaboration song for the Garena Free Fire's 4th anniversary.

"3 Are Legend" project 

3 Are Legend is a supergroup consisting of Dimitri Vegas & Like Mike and American DJ Steve Aoki. The trio have performed together at several music festivals such as TomorrowWorld, Tomorrowland, Creamfields, Ultra Music Festival and Untold. They officially first performed under the 3 Are Legend alias at the 2014 edition of Ultra Music Festival.

Personal lives

Dimitri Vegas is a big comic book fan and owns a large collection, with his favourite being the Spider-Man series. In 2017, Dimitri married Belgian-born DJ and producer Mattn in Ibiza. Vegas has also appeared in several feature films that include Jurassic World: Dominion, The Bouncer, Men in Black: International and Rambo: Last Blood.

Like Mike, in addition to his music career, also writes, produces and raps under the same name. In February 2020 Mike announced the launch of his own record label Green Room for his solo music projects.

For a tour of Scandinavia in 2020, the duo used BMW M8 Competition Gran Coupés as their tour vehicles as part of a promotional endeavour with the car company.

Discography

Concert tours 

On 19 and 20 December 2014, Dimitri Vegas & Like Mike hosted their first concert at Antwerp's Sportpaleis with the event concept "Bringing the World the Madness", which saw 40,000 fans joining them over the two day event. The following year they announced the 2016 edition of the arena show at Antwerp's Sportpaleis increasing the run of dates to four nights (16, 17, 18, 19 December). Tomorrowland founder Michiel Beers The duo's manager, Nick Royaards, help produce and manage the annual event concepts, with Tomorrowland providing production behind all of the shows.

In November 2016, Dimitri Vegas & Like Mike played a "Bringing Germany the Madness" concert, in association with World Club Dome Winter Edition show, at the Veltins Arena in Gelsenkirchen, Germany. The concert entered the German history books following a record-breaking show that saw Dimitri Vegas & Like Mike play to a crowd of 45,000 people — the biggest solo DJ show in Germany ever.

For 2019, Vegas & Mike rebranded their annual concert at Antwerp's Sportpaleis as "Tomorrowland Presents Garden of Madness". The line-up for the 2019 edition featured guests DJs Armin van Buuren, Netsky, Nicky Romero and Lil Kleine. In the build up to the homecoming show in Belgium, Vegas & Mike also toured the Garden of Madness show in Liverpool and New York.

Awards and nominations

DJ Awards

DJ Magazine top 100 DJs

International Dance Music Awards

Pre-2016

2018–present

MTV Europe Music Awards

NRJ Music Awards

WDM Radio Awards

YouTube Creator Awards
Dimitri Vegas & Like Mike  (5.5 million subscribers - Feb 2023)

See also 
 Smash the House
 Tomorrowland

Notes

References

External links 
 Official website

Living people
Belgian people of Greek descent
Belgian record producers
Belgian DJs
Belgian techno music groups
Belgian musical duos
Electro house musicians
Electronic dance music DJs
Electronic dance music duos
Sibling musical duos
Spinnin' Records artists
People from Willebroek
Progressive house musicians
Future house musicians
Year of birth missing (living people)
Remixers
3 Are Legend members